Ellington Airport  is a privately owned, public use airport located two nautical miles (4 km) north of the central business district of Ellington, a town in Tolland County, Connecticut, United States.

The airport, which is open to the public, is one of two Connecticut airports that is state certified as a parachute jump zone. Connecticut Parachutists Inc. has its home base at the airport.

Facilities and aircraft 
Ellington Airport covers an area of 15 acres (6 ha) at an elevation of 253 feet (77 m) above mean sea level. It has one runway designated 1/19 with an asphalt surface measuring 1,800 by 50 feet (549 x 15 m).

For the 12-month period ending April 23, 2009, the airport had 29,120 aircraft operations, an average of 79 per day: 99.9% general aviation and 0.1% air taxi. At that time there were 34 aircraft based at this airport: 59% single-engine, 23% helicopter, and 18% ultralight.

References

External links 
 Ellington Airport web site
 Aerial image as of April 1990 from USGS The National Map
 

Airports in Connecticut
Ellington, Connecticut
Transportation buildings and structures in Tolland County, Connecticut